The GZ series is a series of cruiser style motorcycles built by Suzuki since 1998.

They include:
 Suzuki GZ125 Marauder
 Suzuki Gz150
 Suzuki GZ250
 Suzuki GZ250 Marauder

The GZ series is based primarily on the GN series, and features air-cooled SOHC single-cylinder engines with chain drive.  Like the GN series these bikes were designed to be easy to ride by beginners.  Instrumentation includes a speedometer, odometer with trip, high beam and turn indicator, and a gear position indicator.  

Specifications for the 2009 GZ125
Engine: 125 cc (7.6 cu. in), 4-stroke, air-cooled, SOHC, Carburated
Bore x stroke: 57.0 mm (2.244 in) x 48.8 mm (1.921 in)
Horsepower: 9.86 hp @ 9000 rpm  
Compression ratio: 9.5 : 1
Transmission: 5-speed constant mesh
Final drive: chain
Overall length: 2160 mm (85.0 in)
Overall width: 815 mm (32.1 in)
Overall height: 1090 mm (42.9 in)
Seat height: 680 mm (27.8 in)
Ground clearance: 125 mm ( 4.9 in)
Wheelbase: 1450 mm (57.1 in)
Curb weight: 140 kg (309 lb)
Brakes: front disc, rear drum
Fuel tank capacity: 15.9 L (4.2/3.5 US/Imp gal)

Specifications for the 2012 GZ150 
Engine: 149.5 cc (9.12 cu. in), 4-stroke, air-cooled, SOHC, Fuel Injected
Bore x stroke: 57.0 mm (2.835 in) x 58.6 mm (?in)
Horsepower: 15.42 hp @ 8,000 rpm (11.5kW)
Compression ratio: 9.2 :  1
Transmission: 5-speed constant mesh
Final drive: chain
Overall length: 2250 mm (? in)
Overall width: 900 mm ( ? in)
Overall height: 1160 mm (? in)
Seat height: 710 mm (? in)
Ground clearance: 150 mm ( ? in)
Wheelbase: 1450 mm (? in)
Curb weight: 135 kg (? lb)
Brakes: front disc, rear drum
Fuel tank capacity: 11.5 L (?/? US/Imp gal)

Specifications for the 2009 GZ250
Engine: 249 cc (15.2 cu. in), 4-stroke, air-cooled, SOHC, Carburated
Bore x stroke: 72.0 mm (2.835 in) x 61.2 mm (2.409 in)
Horsepower: 19.72 hp @ 8,000 rpm
Compression ratio: 9.0 :  1
Transmission: 5-speed constant mesh
Final drive: chain
Overall length: 2160 mm (85.0 in)
Overall width: 815 mm (32.1 in)
Overall height: 1090 mm (42.9 in)
Seat height: 680 mm (27.8 in)
Ground clearance: 125 mm ( 4.9 in)
Wheelbase: 1450 mm (57.1 in)
Curb weight: 150 kg (331 lb)
Brakes: 	front disc, rear drum
Fuel tank capacity: 13.0 L (3.4/2.9 US/Imp gal)

External links 
 Suzuki GZ125 Technical
 [https://web.archive.org/web/20100326163928/http://www.suzukicycles.com/Product%20Lines/Cycles/Products/GZ250/2009/GZ250.aspx?category=standard Suzuki 
 
https://www.autoevolution.com/moto/suzuki-gz125-lc-marauder-2003.htm

GZ150 Specifications
 http://alcalamotor.com/suzuki_motos/phone/suzuki-m-chopper-gz-150.html
GZ250 Specifications (archived)]
 http://www.suzuki-gb.co.uk/onroad2011/assets/downloads/2011_Range_Brochure.pdf

References

GZ series